Gavin Brian Lovegrove (born 21 October 1967) is a retired New Zealand track and field athlete who competed in the javelin throw. His personal best of 88.20 m, set in 1996, is the New Zealand record. During his career, he twice represented his homeland at the Summer Olympics (1992 and 1996), won a bronze medal at three consecutive Commonwealth Games (1986, 1990 and 1994) and participated in five World Championships (1987, 1991, 1993, 1995 and 1997). He also twice broke the world junior record (76.68 m and 79.58 m, both 1986) and was a six-time national champion (1987, 1990, 1991, 1992, 1993 and 1994).

After retirement from competition, Lovegrove went into computer science and now works as a web developer.

Personal bests

Seasonal bests by year
1985 – 77.12m (700gm) & 80.00m (800gm – old specifications rules javelin)
1986 – 79.58m (800gm – new specifications rules javelin) – World Junior Record
1987 – 80.20m (800gm)
1988 – 80.70m
1989 – 83.90m
1990 – 82.64m
1991 – 85.18m (Rough tailed implement)
1992 – 86.14m
1993 – 85.34m
1994 – 84.50m
1995 – 85.54m
1996 – 88.20m NR
1997 – 82.38m
1998 – 82.08m

Achievements

References

 
 New Zealand Olympic Committee
 Lovegrove Post Retirement – Graphic Design

1967 births
Living people
New Zealand male javelin throwers
Athletes (track and field) at the 1992 Summer Olympics
Athletes (track and field) at the 1996 Summer Olympics
Olympic athletes of New Zealand
Sportspeople from Hamilton, New Zealand
Commonwealth Games bronze medallists for New Zealand
Athletes (track and field) at the 1986 Commonwealth Games
Athletes (track and field) at the 1990 Commonwealth Games
Athletes (track and field) at the 1994 Commonwealth Games
Commonwealth Games medallists in athletics
Medallists at the 1986 Commonwealth Games
Medallists at the 1990 Commonwealth Games
Medallists at the 1994 Commonwealth Games